Victor Wahlqvist (born April 9, 1991) is a Swedish professional ice hockey player. He played with Linköpings HC in the Elitserien during the 2010–11 Elitserien season.

References

External links

1991 births
Linköping HC players
Living people
Swedish ice hockey right wingers
Ice hockey people from Stockholm